Northeast Coast campaign may refer to:
Northeast Coast campaign (1675)
Northeast Coast campaign (1676)
Northeast Coast campaign (1677)
 Northeast Coast campaign (1703)
Northeast Coast campaign (1712)
 Northeast Coast campaign (1723)
 Northeast Coast campaign (1724)
 Northeast Coast campaign (1745)
 Northeast Coast campaign (1746)
 Northeast Coast campaign (1747)
 Northeast Coast campaign (1750)
 Northeast Coast campaign (1755)
Northeast Coast campaign (1756)